Mathyas Todisoa François Randriamamy (born 23 April 2003) is a professional footballer who plays as a goalkeeper for Championnat National 2 club Sète, on loan from Ligue 1 club Paris Saint-Germain. Born in France, he plays for the Madagascar national team.

Club career
Born in France to parents of Malagasy descent, Randriamamy started his youth career with Paris FC. He joined Paris Saint-Germain (PSG) in 2016. On 16 August 2021, he signed his first professional contract with the club.

On 24 January 2023, Randriamamy joined Championnat National 2 club Sète on loan until the end of the season.

International career
On 22 October 2020, Randriamamy received his first call-up from the Madagascar national team for 2021 Africa Cup of Nations qualification matches against Ivory Coast. He made his debut on 10 October 2021 in a 1–0 FIFA World Cup qualifier win against DR Congo.

Career statistics

Club

International

References

External links
 
 

2003 births
Living people
People from Clamart
Footballers from Hauts-de-Seine
Association football goalkeepers
French sportspeople of Malagasy descent
Black French sportspeople
People with acquired Malagasy citizenship
French footballers
Malagasy footballers
Madagascar international footballers
Paris FC players
Paris Saint-Germain F.C. players
FC Sète 34 players
Championnat National 3 players